Barbara Hillary may refer to:

 Barbara Hillary (model) (born 1949), Playboy magazine's Playmate of the Month, April 1970
 Barbara Hillary (adventurer) (1931–2019), first known African-American woman to reach the North Pole